Plectania is a genus of fungi in the family Sarcosomataceae. There are 15 species in the genus, which have a widespread distribution, especially in northern temperate areas. Plectania was circumscribed by German botanist Karl Wilhelm Gottlieb Leopold Fuckel in 1870.

Species
P. campylospora
P. carranzae
P. chilensis
P. ericae
P. mediterranea
P. melaena
P. megalocrater
P. melastoma
P. milleri
P. nannfeldtii
P. platensis
P. rhytidia
P. rugosa
P. seaveri (Brazil)
P. zugazae

References

Pezizales
Pezizales genera
Taxa named by Karl Wilhelm Gottlieb Leopold Fuckel
Taxa described in 1870